Tito Angelo Nanni (born December 3 1959 in Philadelphia, Pennsylvania) is a former professional baseball player. Over his career Nanni primarily played first base and outfield. Nanni played in the Seattle Mariners organization for the majority of his career. He also spent part of a season playing for the California Angels organization and for the Toronto Blue Jays organization. Nanni played seven seasons in minor league baseball, with a career batting average of .228 with a .338 slugging percentage hits, 112 doubles, 13 triples, and 111 home runs in 3234 at-bats.

Amateur career
Nanni attended Chestnut Hill Academy high school in Philadelphia, Pennsylvania. Nanni is a hall of fame member at his school. During his athletics career at Chestnut Hill, Nanni played baseball, basketball, and football. He was captain and the most valuable player for each sport he played. He was an All-City selection in football, an All-Inter-Ac for basketball, and All-City and All-American for baseball. Nanni is considered to be one of Philadelphia's most astonishing athletes of the 1970s. He received countless offers in both Football and Baseball.

Professional career

Seattle Mariners

1978–1980
Nanni was drafted by the Seattle Mariners in the first round (sixth pick overall) of the 1978 Major League Baseball Draft. He was signed on August 22, and was assigned to the Arizona League Mariners. The chief scout for the Seattle Mariners who signed Nanni, Mel Didier, was later fired because the Mariners claimed Nanni's $100,000 contract violated Major League Baseball regulations. Nanni began his professional career with the Class-A Alexandria Mariners of the Carolina League in 1979. He batted .226 with 91 hits, 19 doubles, 1 triple, and 6 home runs. The next season, 1980, Nanni split time between the Class-A Wausau Timbers and the Class-A San Jose Missions. With the Missions, Nanni batted .199 with 38 hits, 6 doubles, 2 triples, and 3 home runs. With the Timbers, he batted .253 with 60 hits, 8 doubles, and 12 home runs. His 12 home runs that year were tied for third on the Wausau club with Jim Presley.

1981–1984
On March 27, 1981, after spring training, Nanni was assigned to the Triple-A Spokane Indians, however, he played only for the Double-A Lynn Sailors that season. With Lynn, Nanni batted .249 with 90 hits, 14 doubles, 1 triple, 7 home runs, 40 RBIs, and 20 stolen bases in 116 games. On March 11, 1982, the Mariners re-signed Nanni. That season, Nanni continued to play for the Double-A Lynn Sailors. He batted .293 with 71 runs scored, 139 hits, 25 doubles, 5 triples, 16 home runs, 77 RBIs, and 32 stolen bases in 134 games. He was first on the team in hits; tied for first in doubles; second in home runs, RBIs, and runs scored; and was third in triples. In 1983, Nanni was promoted to the Triple-A Salt Lake City Gulls of the Pacific Coast League. He batted .240 with 100 hits, 18 doubles, 5 triples, 11 home runs, 57 RBIs, and 28 stolen bases in 122 games. Nanni's last season in the Mariners' organization would come in the 1984 season with the Triple-A Salt Lake City Gulls. He batted .273 with 127 hits, 23 doubles, 7 triples, and 6 home runs in 135 games. Nanni was tied for first with Jamie Allen in doubles; and was third in hits, and triples.

Later career
In 1985, Nanni spent spring training with the Chicago Cubs and on March 22, he was reassigned to their minor league camp. On April 2, before the start of the season, Nanni was traded to the California Angels for pitcher Ángel Moreno. California then assigned Nanni to the Double-A Midland Angels of the Texas League. He batted .263 with 44 hits, 6 doubles, and 4 home runs in 53 games with Midland that season. Nanni later wound-up in the Toronto Blue Jays organization where he was assigned to the Triple-A Syracuse Chiefs. He finished out the 1985 season with the Chiefs batting .200 with 12 hits, 3 doubles, 1 triple, and 1 home run in 18 games.

Personal
Tito Nanni is the uncle of Ryan	Nanni who played for the University of Delaware baseball team. He is also the nephew of The Four Seasons band member Tommy DeVito. After Nanni's baseball career, he graduated from the University of Utah.

References

External links

1959 births
Baseball players from Philadelphia
Alexandria Mariners players
San Jose Missions players
Wausau Timbers players
Lynn Sailors players
Salt Lake City Gulls players
Midland Angels players
Syracuse Chiefs players
Living people
University of Utah alumni
Chestnut Hill Academy alumni